During the 2006–07 season Cardiff City played in the Football League Championship.  It was the team's fourth year in the Championship since being promoted from League One. The season also saw a change of chairman at the club when Sam Hammam handed over control to Peter Ridsdale.

Season review

Kit
The kits were designed by Spanish company Joma. It was the first season they were sponsored by Communications Direct.

Events 

 31 May 2006 – Cardiff break their record for highest fee received for a player with the sale of Cameron Jerome to Birmingham City for £3 million.
 22 December 2006 – Sam Hammam sells the club to Peter Ridsdale for £27 million.

League

The opening game saw Cardiff win 2–1 over Barnsley on 5 August 2006 before Cardiff fans saw Michael Chopra score his first competitive goal for Cardiff in a 1–0 win over Coventry City. City were undefeated through August four wins and one draw against West Bromwich Albion. Their first loss came at Deepdale in a 2–1 defeat against Preston North End where Chopra scored his second league goal. The side's next win did not come until two games later in a 4–1 win over Luton Town at Ninian Park, going on to win their next four games when Norwich City ended the winning streak. After a 1–0 win over Burnley, Cardiff went four games without scoring, drawing two of these and losing the other two.

On 9 December 2006 Darren Purse scored their first goal since the win over Burnley against Ipswich Town which ended in a 2–2 draw. On 20 January 2007 Cardiff broke their poor run of form after going eleven games without a win with a 2–1 win over Wolverhampton Wanderers. They then went undefeated until a month later on 20 February 2007 this time West Bromwich Albion ended Cardiff's run but the side were still mid-table. Even though they hit straight back with a win over Preston North End, another loss to Birmingham City then a 1–0 win over Norwich City was followed by a winless streak which lasted until the end of the season, finishing in 13th place.

FA Cup

Cardiff entered in the 3rd Round in a home game against Premier League side Tottenham Hotspur on 7 January 2007. A 0–0 draw at Ninian Park took the tie to a replay at White Hart Lane on 17 January which saw Cardiff lose 4–0.

League Cup

In the first round of the League Cup, Cardiff were drawn against League Two side Barnet but a team made up of reserve and youth players were beaten 2–0.

FAW Cup

Cardiff beat Carmarthen Town in the quarter-finals before being eliminated by The New Saints in the semi-finals.

First-team squad

Squad statistics

|}

Transfers

Summer transfer window ins

January transfer window ins

Loans in

Summer transfer window outs

January transfer window outs

Loans out

Standings

Results by round

Fixtures and results

Championship

FA Cup

League Cup

FAW Premier Cup

Awards

 Football League Championship Apprentice of the Year: Chris Gunter

References

See also
Cardiff City F.C. seasons
2006–07 in English football

Cardiff City F.C. seasons
Cardiff City
Cardiff City